Year 155 (CLV) was a common year starting on Tuesday (link will display the full calendar) of the Julian calendar. At the time, it was known as the Year of the Consulship of Severus and Rufinus (or, less frequently, year 908 Ab urbe condita). The denomination 155 for this year has been used since the early medieval period, when the Anno Domini calendar era became the prevalent method in Europe for naming years.

Births 
 Cao Cao, Chinese statesman and warlord (d. 220)
 Dio Cassius, Roman historian (d. c. 235)
 Tertullian, Roman Christian theologian (d. c. 240)
 Sun Jian, Chinese general and warlord  (d. 191)

Deaths 
 Pius I, Roman bishop
 Polycarp, bishop of Smyrna (b. AD 65)

References